The Fellowship Farm Cooperative Association was a Utopian anarchist community in the Stelton section of Piscataway Township, New Jersey that was started in 1912.

History
The farm was inaugurated on Thanksgiving Day in 1912.  of active farmland was purchased by Ernest H. Liebel from  J. C. Letson in Stelton and each member was leased  of land. The project was supervised by G. E. Littlefield of Massachusetts. An advertisement was placed in the New York Call to attract people to the project. Samuel Goldman (1882-1969) began building the Goldman House in the Modern School colony in 1915. Also in 1915 members of the Ferrer movement bought adjacent land and started the Ferrer Colony and Modern School and they would eventually share a cooperative store.

See also
Ferrer Colony and Modern School

Further reading
Publications relating to Fellowship Farm Co-operative Association

External links
Map:

References

Piscataway, New Jersey
Utopian communities in the United States
1915 establishments in New Jersey